= Lower Lena Hydropower Project =

The Lower Lena Hydropower Project of the 1970s assumed the creation of a hydro plant on the river Lena at the place which is close to its mouth with installed capacity 20 GW and annual production above 100 TWh. The Lower Lena HPP (Russian: Нижнеленская ГЭС, Nizhnelenskaya HES) was envisioned as an effort to improve navigation conditions in the lower flow of the river for large scale ships upstream to Yakutsk. The location of the proposed HPP was chosen on the base of convenient landscape at this place, which includes narrow river channel and highland topography.

In the case of realization of this project the hydro power plant and its reservoir would have following parameters:

Parameter	Value
Installed capacity:	20 GW
Annual production:	≈100 TWh
Dam length:	2,300 metres (7,500 ft)
Dam height:	118 metres (387 ft)
Reservoir surface area:	65,000 square kilometres (25,000 sq mi)
Reservoir maximum depth:	125 metres (410 ft)
Reservoir average depth:	35 metres (115 ft)
Reservoir length:	1,694 kilometres (1,053 mi)
Reservoir average width:	70 kilometres (43 mi)
Reservoir volume:	1,900 cubic kilometres (460 cu mi)
Catchment area:	2,430,000 square kilometres (940,000 sq mi)
Average discharge near proposed dam:	≈17,000 m³/s (≈600,349 cu ft/s)
Hydraulic head:	90 metres (300 ft)
